The following is a list of notable events and releases of the year 2017 in Danish music.

Events

January
 5 – Royal Danish Opera announces that its artistic director, Sven Müller, will leave his position in 2017, three years ahead of schedule. Müller is believed to have resigned because of financial cuts.

February
 25 – At the 47th edition of the Dansk Melodi Grand Prix, "Where I Am", performed by Anja Nissen, is selected as Denmark's entry for the Eurovision Song Contest.

March
 28 – Under its new conductor Fabio Luisi, the Danish National Symphony Orchestra begins a tour of the United States.
 31 – The live final of X Factor (Denmark) is won by Morten Nørgaard.

April

May
 13 – In the final of the Eurovision Song Contest 2017, Denmark finish in 20th place.
 31 – The 19th Distortion festival started in Copenhagen (May 31 - June 4).

June
 17 – The 8th NorthSide Festival opened in Aarhus (June 17–19).
 22 – The 8th Copenhell festival started in Copenhagen (June 22–24).
 24
 The 3rd Tinderbox Festival started in Odense (June 24–27).
 The 47th Roskilde Festival opened (June 24 - July 1).
  28 – The 33rd Nibe Festival started in Nordjylland (June 28 - July 1).

July
 7 – The 38th Copenhagen Jazz Festival start in Copenhagen (July 7 – 16).
 13 – G! Festival opened in Göta, Eysturoy, Faroe Islands (July 13–15).
 14 – The 29th Aarhus Jazz Festival started (July 14–22).

August
 2 – The Strøm Fesatival started in Copenhagen (August 2–5).

September
 6 – The Copenhagen World Music Festival started (September 6–10).

October

November

December

Album releases

January

May

November

Deaths 

 February
 7 – Svend Asmussen, jazz violinist, known as "The Fiddling Viking" (born 1916).
 20 – Nicolai Munch-Hansen, Danish bassist and composer (born 1977).

 March
 27 – Peter Bastian, bassoonist (born 1943).

 May
 4 - Katy Bødtger, singer (born 1932).

 June
 8 - Ivan Horn, rock guitarist (born 1949).

See also 
Music of Denmark
Denmark in the Eurovision Song Contest 2017

References

 
Danish music
Danish
Music